The Skyland Camp-Bowman Lake Ranger Station in Glacier National Park was originally built as the Culver Boys' Military Academy. The main building, known variously as the Skyland Camp Messhall, Culver Boys' Military Academy Messhall and Skyline Chalet, was built in 1920 and is a good example of National Park Service Rustic architecture. The main cabin, known as "Rainbow Lodge" was built by the boys of the academy in 1920 from red cedar logs, and is more elaborate and carefully detailed than typical ranger stations of this period. The interior is dominated by a stone fireplace.

The camp was originally owned by the Culver Military Academy of Culver, Indiana, which operated the camp as a concession within the park, on the shore of Bowman Lake. It operated for a few seasons, but poor management caused the National Park Service to terminate the camp's contract. With the camp falling into disrepair, the Park Service demolished all buildings except the Rainbow Lodge in  1940, rehabilitating the lodge for use as a ranger station. Two boathouses are included in the listed area, and many furnishings in the ranger station are contributing features.

See also

Belly River Ranger Station Historic District
Cut Bank Ranger Station Historic District
East Glacier Ranger Station Historic District
Kintla Lake Ranger Station
Kishenehn Ranger Station Historic District
Logging Creek Ranger Station Historic District
Nyack Ranger Station Historic District
Polebridge Ranger Station Historic District
Saint Mary Ranger Station
Sherburne Ranger Station Historic District
Swiftcurrent Ranger Station Historic District
Upper Lake McDonald Ranger Station Historic District
Walton Ranger Station Historic District
Polebridge to Numa Ridge Phoneline

References

Ranger stations in Glacier National Park (U.S.)
Park buildings and structures on the National Register of Historic Places in Montana
Government buildings completed in 1920
National Park Service rustic in Montana
National Register of Historic Places in Flathead County, Montana
1920 establishments in Montana
National Register of Historic Places in Glacier National Park
Summer camps in the United States